Live at Budokan is a DVD by pop rock singer-songwriter Butch Walker, released on December 13, 2005, by Epic Records. It contains two concerts — a 40-minute full-band set, recorded in Tokyo, Japan during Walker's 2005 tour with Avril Lavigne, and 75-minute acoustic set, recorded in Atlanta, Georgia in 2003.

Content

Live at Budokan
The DVD's main feature is a concert recorded on Walker's "Bonez Tour" supporting Avril Lavigne at Nippon Budokan in Tokyo, Japan on March 15, 2005. Each song is followed by a documentary interlude of self-shot material by Walker, filmed on the streets of Tokyo and in the venue's backstage area. Just before "I Want You to Want Me" (a Cheap Trick cover version of a song off their 1978 album Cheap Trick at Budokan), there are two rather inaudible bootleg clips of two covers played during the tour of Elvis Costello's "Radio Radio" and Blur's "Song 2".

Setlist
"Radio Tokyo"
"Uncomfortably Numb"
"#1 Summer Jam"
"Last Flight Out"
"Mixtape"
"Best Thing You Never Had"
"I Want You to Want Me" (Cheap Trick cover)
"Lights Out"

This is me... Justified and Stripped
As a bonus, the DVD also features an acoustic concert filmed between the releases of Left of Self-Centered (2002) and Letters (2004). The set includes tracks from both albums, as well as many Marvelous 3 tunes and fractions of cover versions in between songs, including the Carpenters' "Close to You", Maxi Priest's "Close to You", Nelly's "Pimp Juice" and OutKast's "Ms. Jackson". The concert was filmed on June 7, 2003, at the Variety Playhouse in Atlanta, Georgia. Excerpts of it can also be found on Walker's 2004 live album This Is Me... Justified and Stripped.

Setlist
"Sober"
"Promise"
"Race Cars and Goth Rock"
"Diary of a San Fernando Sexx Star"
"Mixtape"
"Don't Move"
"Best Thing You Never Had"
"Cigarette Lighter Love Song" (Marvelous 3 original)
"Suburbia"
"Bohemian Rhapsody" (Queen cover)
"Grant Park" (Marvelous 3 original)
"Over Your Head" (Marvelous 3 original)
"Every Monday" (Marvelous 3 original)
"Freak of the Week" (Marvelous 3 original)
"Let Me Go" (Marvelous 3 original)
"Take Tomorrow (One Day at a Time)"

Personnel
Michael Guy Chislett – guitar, piano
Kenny Cresswell – drums
Darren Dodd – drums
Jayce Fincher – bass
JT Hall – bass
Mitch "Slug" McLee – drums
Butch Walker – vocals, guitar, piano

References
  

2005 video albums
Butch Walker albums
Albums recorded at the Nippon Budokan